Volleyball at the 2000 Summer Paralympics in Sydney consisted of standing and sitting volleyball events for men.

Medal summary

Medal table

Men's standing volleyball team rosters 
Source: International Paralympic Committee

Men's sitting volleyball team rosters 
Source: International Paralympic Committee

References 

 Volleyball at the Sydney 2000 Paralympic Games
 

 
2000 Summer Paralympics events
2000
Paralympics
International volleyball competitions hosted by Australia